The Willunga railway line ran through the southern Adelaide suburbs from Adelaide railway station to Willunga, over  long (longer than the current Gawler line). The line was opened in Willunga by the Governor of South Australia Sir Henry Galway on 20 January 1915, and initially had 16 stopping places between Adelaide and Willunga. It closed beyond Hallett Cove in 1969 and was dismantled in 1972. The Seaford railway line continues from Hallett Cove along a different alignment before rejoining the route of the old line between Seaford Road and Griffiths Drive.

There is some evidence of railway track remaining on this trail, notably near the South Road crossing at Hackham, the top of the Seaford Hill and a small section of track in a paddock adjacent to Victor Harbor Road, McLaren Vale. Occasionally, rails surface through the bitumen at Field Street, McLaren Vale. At Morphett Vale, there is a partially buried platform. There is also some concrete foundations on the platform. These structures are thought to be remains from the Morphett Vale railway station.

At the time of its opening, there was a proposal to extend it to Second Valley to connect with coastal steam shipping to Kangaroo Island for holidays, with the route already approved as far as Normanville and Yankalilla. This extension was never built.

References 

Closed railway lines in South Australia
Railway lines opened in 1918
Railway lines closed in 1969